The 1994 Volkswagen Cup was a tennis tournament played on grass courts at the Devonshire Park Lawn Tennis Club in Eastbourne in the United Kingdom that was part of Tier II of the 1994 WTA Tour. The tournament was held from 13 June until 18 June 1994. Unseeded Meredith McGrath won the singles title.

Finals

Singles

 Meredith McGrath defeated  Linda Harvey-Wild 6–2, 6–4
 It was McGrath's second singles title of the year and the second of her career.

Doubles

 Gigi Fernández /  Natalia Zvereva defeated  Inés Gorrochategui /  Helena Suková 6–7, 6–4, 6–3
 It was Fernandez's 7th doubles title of the year and the 51st of her career. It was Zvereva's 7th doubles title of the year and the 46th of her career.

References

External links
 ITF tournament edition details
 Tournament draws

Volkswagen Cup
Eastbourne International
Volkswagen Cup
Volkswagen Cup
Volkswagen Cup